Andrew Williams (born 23 September 1977 in Toronto, Ontario, Canada) is a Canadian-Jamaican retired footballer who last played as a midfielder for Real Salt Lake in Major League Soccer.

Career

College
Williams played college soccer for the University of Rhode Island where he remains the team's all-time leading scorer, with 52 goals and 45 assists.

Williams is one of 22 college players to be part of the 40-40 club, having both 40 goals and 40 assists in their college career. As of 2018, he is the most recent member of the 40-40 club.

Professional
After spending a couple of years in his home country with Real Mona, Williams joined Major League Soccer in 1998 with the Columbus Crew, with whom he would play for two seasons. In 2000, he moved to the Miami Fusion, but would only remain there one year before going to the New England Revolution. Williams played in 2001 and beginning of 2002 with New England, before moving to the MetroStars in a six-player deal in the middle of the 2002 season. He only lasted half a season with the Metros, soon traded again, to the Chicago Fire, with whom he played for two years.

Williams became the second player in Real Salt Lake history when he was their first selection in the 2004 MLS Expansion Draft. He became the first player in MLS history to play for six teams. In his ten years in the league, Williams has scored 27 goals and added 78 assists.
After leading Jamaica to the Caribbean title in 2008, Williams suffered through the prolonged illness of his wife during the 2009 season, which culminated with Real Salt Lake winning the MLS Cup in November 2009.  The Williams family received further good news in late 2009/early 2010 as Marcia Williams' cancer went into remission.  In 2010, Williams returned to Real Salt Lake focused and re-energized.

Williams' contract with Real Salt Lake ended after the 2011 season and he opted to participate in the 2011 MLS Re-Entry Draft. After he was not selected in Stage 1 of the draft, Williams announced his retirement from professional soccer on 5 December 2011.

In 2014 Andy Williams joined the coaching staff for Real Salt Lake when new head coach, Jeff Cassar, named him as an assistant coach (Midfield coach) and in addition to his assistant coach duties. Andy oversaw and coached the reserve team for Real Salt Lake.
Williams became Head Scout at Real Salt Lake, and has since played an integral part in the signings of several players.

International
Despite being something of a journeyman in Major League Soccer, Williams has been a stalwart for the Jamaica national team. He has 97 caps with the team and 13 goals, and was often the focal point of their offense, running the team from the central midfield. Williams played for his country in the 1998 FIFA World Cup, making one substitute appearance. Williams retired from the Jamaican team following their failure to qualify for the 2006 FIFA World Cup. Despite his initial retirement, Williams was called in for a June 2008 friendly vs. Saint Vincent and the Grenadines, in which he played the full 90. Williams was also called in for Jamaica's 2010 World Cup qualifying campaign and played five games, scoring against Canada in a 1–1 draw.

Personal life
Andy Williams was born in Toronto, Ontario, Canada, but grew up in Kingston, Jamaica.  His father, Bobby Williams, played for the Jamaica national team in the 1960s. Married Shauna Marie Williams on April 24, 2021.

Honors

Real Salt Lake
Major League Soccer MLS Cup (1): 2009
Major League Soccer Eastern Conference Championship (1): 2009

Chicago Fire
MLS Supporters' Shield Supporters Shield (1): 2003
Lamar Hunt U.S. Open Cup (1): 2003

Jamaica 
Caribbean Cup:
Winner (2): 2005, 2008

See also
 List of men's footballers with 100 or more international caps

References

External links
 
 MLS Best of: Andy Williams

1977 births
Living people
Canadian soccer players
Jamaican footballers
Jamaica international footballers
Jamaican expatriate footballers
Columbus Crew players
Miami Fusion players
New England Revolution players
New York Red Bulls players
Chicago Fire FC players
Real Salt Lake players
Soccer players from Toronto
Canadian sportspeople of Jamaican descent
Black Canadian soccer players
1998 CONCACAF Gold Cup players
1998 FIFA World Cup players
2000 CONCACAF Gold Cup players
2003 CONCACAF Gold Cup players
2005 CONCACAF Gold Cup players
Harbour View F.C. players
Expatriate soccer players in the United States
Major League Soccer players
Rhode Island Rams men's soccer players
Real Salt Lake non-playing staff
Association football midfielders
All-American men's college soccer players
FIFA Century Club